Born to Do It is the debut studio album by English singer Craig David, released in the United Kingdom on 14 August 2000 by Wildstar Records and in the United States later in 2001 by Atlantic Records. Following exposure from his work with British group Damage, David began performing vocals for garage duo Artful Dodger. During this time, Wildstar Records became aware of David, offering him a development deal before offering an album contract. The recording for the album began in 1999 before David had acquired a record contract, the recording lasted until 2000 and was composed by David himself and Mark Hill.

The title comes from a quote describing the character Willy Wonka in the 1971 film Willy Wonka & the Chocolate Factory. Born to Do It is a 2-step garage and R&B album, backed by electro beats, garage and hip hop. The album's songs contain acoustic guitars and insistent thumps of beats and bass, with lyrics that revolve around themes of romance, the complexities of relationships, and clubbing. Upon release, the album was met with positive reviews from music critics and was listed as one of the "Greatest Albums Ever" by MTV.

Commercially, the album was a success, eventually selling over 7.5 million copies worldwide, making it one of the biggest albums by a UK R&B artist. The album debuted at number one on the UK Albums Chart, becoming the fastest-selling debut album ever by a British male solo act, and eventually being certified 6× Platinum in the region. The album spawned four singles, including the UK number ones "Fill Me In" and "7 Days", and the successful "Walking Away" and "Rendezvous".

Background
David's earliest exposure came when he featured on "I'm Ready", the B-side to British boy band Damage's 1997 cover of "Wonderful Tonight"; he then began performing vocals for a few tracks with the English garage duo Artful Dodger. Wildstar Records first became aware of David when the artist's then manager Paul Widger met the label's co-owner Colin Lester and played some of his music. Lester later told HitQuarters that he was particularly impressed by the first song he heard, "Walking Away". The Wildstar boss was further won over when, on later visiting the artist's home in Southampton, he found that David's tiny bedroom stacked from floor to ceiling with 12" vinyl records, commenting: "That convinced me he was the real deal and not just some kid acting out the part." At that point, Lester offered him a development deal with his label. When Lester later heard the song "7 Days", he said he immediately heard a number-one record and promoted the contract to an album deal the same day.

Recording

After David and Mark Hill met, Hill enlisted David to feature on Artful Dodger's debut album. Hill found it hard to pay David for his appearances so instead offered him studio time and help with production at a small recording studio in Southampton. The album's recording began in 1999 and lasted through until 2000, Hill took responsibility for the album's production along with David, whilst David wrote the majority of the album's lyrics with co-writing from Hill. Hill stated that because there was no label during this time the pair had more creative freedom when creating the album;

The album was solely produced by David and Hill, whilst the latter also provided backing vocals, engineering and mixing. Ceri Evans also served as one of the album's producers, alongside Wayne Lawes who also provided drum programming, programming, remixing and vocal production, Fraser T. Smith also provided programming.
A variety of other people were called up during the album's production, Dick Beetham helped with the mastering of the album whilst Andy Ward served as of the album's mixing engineers, with Goetz who provided engineering and mixing, Steve Fitzmaurice also provided mixing.
Around the time that "Re-Rewind (The Crowd Say Bo Selecta)" began to gain commercial success, the majority of the album was recorded and produced. The last song to be recorded was the album's lead single "Fill Me In". Hill stated he wanted to create a song that contained a garage element in order to bridge the gap between Craig's project and his previous work with The Artful Dodger. Following the album's recording, David acquired a recording contract.

Music and lyrics
Born to Do It merges smooth-soul over cascades of glistening keyboards, circling guitars, and sophisticated rhythms. The album merges current R&B vocal stylings and UK garage beats, creating a "pristine and immaculate" album. Ernest Hardy of Rolling Stone described the album as composed of electro-rouged beats of two-step garage, which Hardy compared to that of Teddy Riley and Timbaland; however, Hardy stated the album was also different from Rileys and Timbalands due to the album's ability to strike balance between traditional pop and R&B, using modern production flash as the bridge. The album's music contains acoustic guitars and prominently placed strings, layered just so over the insistent thump of beats and bass, even in the ballads.

The album's lyrical content focuses on themes of romance, the complexities of relationships, and clubbing. The album was noted for a range of lyrical themes from "the kind of sappy fare that lovesick teenagers play for one another late at night over the phone" to more self-conscious songs such as "Booty Man." David's vocals were described as "creamy" by Ernest Hardy of Rolling Stone who continued to describe his vocals has giving "texture", stating the David sounded like a boy becoming a "smooth" man. David's vocals were seen as being able to "flutter" over the album's "stuttering beats" and "race ahead of those same beats while still keeping time."

The album opens with "Fill Me In", a garage and R&B song built over plinky keyboards and sticatto strings, that lyrically speaks on a modern-day tale of forbidden love. Tracks six and eight "Last Night" and "Time to Party" both take influence from hip hop and contain spoken rap-like breakdowns, while relaying on a dance production. "Time to Party" also includes a brief sample of Busta Rhymes's "Put Your Hands Where My Eyes Can See".
"Booty Man" features a folky acoustic guitar-driven production that features "overtly cocky lyrics." "Rewind" is a collaboration with two-step band Artful Dodger, the song is a bass-heavy track that features no R&B influences, unlike the rest of the album.

Release and promotion
Born to Do It was released first in the United Kingdom on 14 August 2000 by the independent record label Wildstar Records and was later released in the United States in 2001 by Atlantic Records. In 2007, Wildstar Records and Atlantic Records released the album for digital download. The album was also released in Singapore in a limited edition bonus CD single format, the release featured four remixes, including a radio edit, an Ignorants remix, DJ Chunky remix and a Better Day remix. The title Born to Do It comes from a quote describing the character Willy Wonka in the 1971 film Willy Wonka & the Chocolate Factory.

The album was promoted with the release of four singles; the first, "Fill Me In", was released on 3 April 2000 and became a commercial success, debuting at number one on the UK Singles Chart, making David the youngest British male to have a number one single. On 28 December 2009, when BBC Radio 1 presenter Nihal revealed "The Official Top 100 Songs of the Decade", "Fill Me In" was at number 93. The song also saw success internationally, peaking at number 15 in the United States.

The album's second single, "7 Days", was released on 24 July 2000, the song debuted at number one on the UK Singles Chart after selling more than 100,000 copies in its first week, giving David his second consecutive UK number-one single and spending 15 weeks inside the UK top 75. It became David's only top 10 single on the US Billboard Hot 100, where it reached number 10. The song also reached number four in Australia and number six in New Zealand.

The album's third single, "Walking Away", was released on 31 October 2000, the song fared well on charts and became a huge success in New Zealand where it reached number one and became the number one song of 2001 in the region, combining both sales and airplay.

Commercial performance
Born to Do It debuted at number one on the UK Albums Chart, selling 225,320 copies in its first week, in doing so, the album became the fastest-selling debut album ever by a British male solo act, a record the album still holds. The album has since been listed as the 45th-fastest-selling album ever. The album went on to be certified 6× Platinum by the British Phonographic Industry (BPI) for shipments of 1.8 million copies. The album went on to become the 35th-best-selling album of the decade in the United Kingdom. It has sold over 1.94 million copies in the UK as of April 2020.

Born to Do It was a huge success worldwide, in Australia, it debuted at number eight on the week of 24 September 2000, the album went on to peak at number two on the Australian Albums Chart, where it stayed for five weeks. Born to Do It spent 52 weeks (one year) on the chart and was certified 4× Platinum by the Australian Recording Industry Association for shipments of 280,000 copies. The album saw similar success in New Zealand where it also peaked at number two on the charts and spent a total of 51 weeks before eventually being certified Platinum.

Prior to the album's US release, it had sold 3.5 million copies worldwide. Born to Do It peaked at number 11 on the US Billboard 200 and spent 62 weeks on the chart, and was eventually certified Platinum by the Recording Industry Association of America (RIAA) for shipments of one million copies. The album was listed as the 156th-best-selling album on the year in the United States. As well as appearing on the Billboard 200, the album also peaked at number 12 on the US Top R&B/Hip-Hop Albums chart. The album has sold eight million copies worldwide.

Critical reception

Born to Do It received acclaim from music critics. Davey Boy of Sputnikmusic described the album as an "excellent debut" continuing to state that David was a "mature 19-year-old singer-songwriter whose soulfully smooth voice will result in fans thinking he is singing to them and only them."

Legacy

At the 2001 Brit Awards, the music video for the album's second single, "7 Days" was nominated for the Best Music Video award, but lost out to the music video for "Rock DJ" by Robbie Williams. Following the album's release, David was nominated for three MOBO Awards, including best newcomer and best album for Born to Do It. David was also nominated for four Brit Awards in 2001, including Best British Album.
Born to Do It became the fastest-selling debut album ever by a British male solo act, a record the album still holds. The album has since been listed as the 45th-fastest-selling album ever.

With the album's lead single going to number one in the UK, David (at 18 years and 334 days old), became the youngest British male to have a UK number-one single since Jimmy Osmond, and was the youngest solo artist at the time to have his debut single go to number one in the UK. This record has since been surpassed by Gareth Gates, who was 17 years and 255 days old when he debuted at number one with "Unchained Melody" in March 2002. The album would serve as a musical inspiration to producer Rodney Jerkins during his work on Brandy's third studio album, Full Moon, following a gig in London, England, months before where he was exposed to the UK garage collaborations between David and Artful Dodger.

In 2001, the album was the subject of a question on the ITV quiz show Who Wants to Be a Millionaire? Contestant Charles Ingram was required to identify the artist responsible for the album in order to win £32,000. Ingram claimed to be unfamiliar with Craig David but chose the answer regardless, correctly answering the question. Ingram became famous for cheating on this question and many others on the show.

In a 2009 poll devised by MTV to find the Greatest Album Ever, MTV viewers voted Born to Do It as their second-most favourite, behind Michael Jackson's Thriller.

Track listing

Personnel
Credits adapted from AllMusic and album's liner notes. The track numbers correspond to the US release.

Dick Beetham – mastering
Andrea Brooks – design
Craig David – vocals (all tracks), producer (track 2)
Steve Fitzmaurice – mixing (tracks 1, 9)
Fraser T. Smith – programming (track 2)
Goetz – mixing engineer (tracks 8, 10, 11)
Victoria Hallett – additional vocals (tracks 4, 8)
Mark Hill – producer (tracks 1, 3–5, 7–14), mixing (tracks 3–6, 8, 10–14), additional vocals (tracks 3, 4)
Wayne Lawes – remixing, vocal producer, additional production, bass, and drum programming (track 7)
Pete Moss – photography
Kowan Paul – producer (track 6)
Jeremy Paul – producer (track 6)
Rickardo Reid – keyboards and programming (track 7)
Andy Ward – mixing engineer (track 4)
F Zagaroli – additional vocals (track 8)

Charts

Weekly charts

Year-end charts

Decade-end charts

Certifications

See also
 List of UK Albums Chart number ones of the 2000s
 List of best-selling albums of the 2000s (decade) in the United Kingdom
 List of best-selling albums of the 2000s (century) in the United Kingdom

Release history

References

External links
 Born to Do It at Discogs

2000 debut albums
Craig David albums